Pedro Miguel Fangueiro de São Payo Cary (born 10 May 1984) is a Portuguese futsal player who plays for Leões Porto Salvo and the Portugal national team.

Honours
UEFA Futsal Champions League: 2018–19

References

External links

FPF club profile

1983 births
Living people
People from Faro, Portugal
Portuguese men's futsal players
C.F. Os Belenenses futsal players
Sporting CP futsal players
Sportspeople from Faro District